Gudas, Belgaum is a village According to Census 2011 information the location code or village code of Gudas village is 597594. Gudas village is located in Hukeri taluka of Belgaum district in Karnataka, India. It is situated 11km away from sub-district headquarter Hukkeri (tehsildar office) and 63km away from district headquarter Belgaum. As per 2009 stats, Gudas village is also a gram panchayat.

The total geographical area of village is 1215.01 hectares. Gudas has a total population of 4,327 peoples, out of which male population is 2,220 while female population is 2,107. There are about 902 houses in Gudas village. Pincode of gudas village locality is 591310.

Hukkeri is nearest town to gudas for all major economic activities, which is approximately 11km away.in Belgaum district in the southern state of Karnataka, India.

References

Villages in Belagavi district